More Today Than Yesterday is the debut (and only) album by Spiral Starecase and was released in 1969.  It reached No. 79 on the Billboard Top LPs chart.

Two singles were released from the album: "More Today Than Yesterday" reached No. 12 on the Billboard Hot 100 and "No One for Me to Turn To" reached No. 52.

Track listing
 "More Today Than Yesterday" – 2:56 (Pat Upton)
 "Broken-Hearted Man" – 3:02 (Pat Upton)
 "For Once in My Life" – 3:00 (Ron Miller/Orlando Murden)
 "This Guy's in Love with You" – 3:30 (Burt Bacharach/Hal David)
 "Sweet Little Thing" – 2:29 (Pat Upton)
 "Proud Mary" – 2:40 (John Fogerty)
 "The Thought of Loving You" – 3:00 (David White)
 "Our Day Will Come" – 2:46 (Bob Hilliard/Mort Garson)
 "No One for Me to Turn To" – 2:31 (Pat Upton)
 "Since I Don't Have You" – 2:39 (The Skyliners/Joseph Rock/Lennie Martin)
 "Judas to the Love We Knew" – 2:33 (Pat Upton)

Charts

Singles

References

1969 debut albums
Spiral Starecase albums
Columbia Records albums